Brigitte Douay (born 24 February 1947 in Paris) is a French politician and Member of the European Parliament for the north-west of France. She is a member of the Socialist Party, which is part of the Party of European Socialists, and sits on the Committee on Budgets.

She is also a substitute for the Committee on Regional Development, a member of the delegation for relations with Japan, and a substitute for the delegation to the EU–Mexico Joint Parliamentary Committee.

Career
 Degree in classics (1968), graduate of Sciences Po
 Teacher (1971)
 Editorial secretary on 30 jours d'Europe (1971–1972)
 Editorial secretary on issues of the Moniteur devoted to public works (1972–1973)
 Journalist (1974–1977)
 Press attaché to Pierre Mauroy, Mayor of Lille and Chairman of the Nord-Pas-de-Calais region (1977–1981)
 Press attaché in the office of Pierre Mauroy, Prime Minister (1981–1984)
 Press and parliamentary attaché in the office of the State Secretary for the Civil Service (1984–1986)
 Responsible for external relations at the Commission for the National Plan (1986–1988)
 Responsible for public relations, Nord-Pas-de-Calais region (1988–1993)
 Responsible for public relations at Lille Grand Palais (congress centre) (1993–1997)
 Director of communications, Jean-Jaurès Foundation (2003–2004)
 Member of Cambrai Municipal Council (2001–2004)
 Member of the Nord-Pas-de-Calais Regional Council (since 2004)
 Member of the National Assembly for Nord (1997–2002)
 Chairwoman of the national anti-counterfeiting committee (1997–2002)

External links
 Official website (in French)
 European Parliament biography
 Declaration of financial interests (in French; PDF file)

1947 births
Living people
Sciences Po alumni
MEPs for North-West France 2004–2009
Members of Parliament for Nord
21st-century women MEPs for France
Socialist Party (France) politicians
Socialist Party (France) MEPs
Politicians from Paris